Merthyr Tydfil County Borough is located in the historic county of Glamorgan in Wales and takes its name from its largest town. There are three sites on the register of parks and gardens in Merthyr Tydfil County Borough. Two are listed at Grade II*, and one is Grade II.

The Cadw/ICOMOS Register of Parks and Gardens of Special Historic Interest in Wales was established in 2002 and given statutory status in 2022. It is administered by Cadw, the historic environment agency of the Welsh Government. Elizabeth Whittle described Cadw as having a "somewhat special and guiding role" in the preservation of historic parks and gardens, since they are "an integral part of Welsh archaeological and architectural heritage". The register includes just under 400 sites, ranging from gardens of private houses, to cemeteries and public parks. Parks and gardens are listed at one of three grades, matching the grading system used for listed buildings. Grade I is the highest grade, for sites of exceptional interest; Grade II*, the next highest, denotes parks and gardens of more than special interest; while Grade II denotes nationally important sites of special interest.

At the beginning of the 19th century Merthyr Tydfil was the largest town in Glamorgan. The previous fifty years had seen the establishment of four major ironworks in the area, Dowlais, Plymouth, Cyfarthfa and Penydarren, and the registered sites are all associated with of the impact that this industrial development had on the region. The oldest of the registered sites is Cyfarthfa Castle which dates from 1825. Before becoming a public park in 1910 it was the estate of the Crawshay family whose ironworks it overlooked. In the early 19th century, Cyfarthfa, with around 1,500 workers, was the largest ironworks in the world. By the middle of the century it had been overtaken by Dowlais which employed over 7,000 workers. In 1851, the population of the town of Merthyr Tydfil had grown to 46,000, twice that of Cardiff or Swansea, leading to the creation of a public cemetery in 1859 to the north-west of the town near the village of Cefn-coed-y-cymmer. It is registered together with the adjacent Jewish burial ground established to serve the communities of mainly Polish, Romanian and Russian Jews that were drawn to the region by the mining and iron industries. In the 1910s, when the colliery ran out of space on the valley floor, it started tipping waste on the mountainside above the village of Aberfan. This eventually led to the disaster in 1966 when the catastrophic collapse of a spoil tip resulted in 144 deaths. The site of the tip and the slide area has been landscaped and is registered together with the Garden of Remembrance and Aberfan Cemetery.

Key

List of parks and gardens

|}

See also

 List of scheduled monuments in Merthyr Tydfil County Borough
 Grade I listed buildings in Merthyr Tydfil County Borough
 Grade II* listed buildings in Merthyr Tydfil County Borough

Notes

References

Bibliography

Merthyr Tydfil
Merthyr Tydfil